A functional food is a food claimed to have an additional  (often one related to health promotion or disease prevention) by adding new ingredients or more of existing ingredients. The term may also apply to traits purposely bred into existing edible plants, such as purple or gold potatoes having increased anthocyanin or carotenoid contents, respectively. Functional foods may be "designed to have physiological benefits and/or reduce the risk of chronic disease beyond basic nutritional functions, and may be similar in appearance to conventional food and consumed as part of a regular diet".

The term was first used in the 1980s in Japan, where there is a government approval process for functional foods called Foods for Specified Health Use (FOSHU).

Industry 
The functional food industry, consisting of food, beverage and supplement sectors, is one of the several areas of the food industry that is experiencing fast growth in recent years. It is estimated that the global market of functional food industry will reach 176.7 billion in 2013 with a compound annual growth rate (CAGR) of 7.4%. Specifically, the functional food sector will experience 6.9% CAGR, the supplement sector will rise by 3.8% and the functional beverage sector will be the fastest growing segment with 10.8% CAGR. This kind of growth is fueled not only by industrial innovation and development of new products that satisfy the demand of health conscious consumers, but also by health claims covering a wide range of health issues. Yet, consumer skepticism persists mainly because benefits associated with consuming the products may be difficult to detect. Strict examination of some of the functional food claims may discourage some companies from launching their products.

Honey 
Honey can contain a range of phytochemicals that may help bees to tolerate cold, resist pesticides and infections, heal wounds, and possibly live longer. Given floral diversity in their pollen sources, bees may have the ability to choose nectar varieties that have positive attributes for health.

See also

 Functional beverage
 Medical food, specially formulated foods to treat diseases with distinctive nutritional needs

References

External links
 Functional Foods: Public Health Boon or 21st Century Quackery? , a review of regulations and demand for functional foods in Japan, the U.S. and the UK (March 1999)

Functional food